Pavlovka is a rural locality (a selo) in Lermontovsky Selsoviet of Seryshevsky District, Amur Oblast, Russia. The population was 65 as of 2018. There are 3 streets.

Geography 
Pavlovka is located 46 km northeast of Seryshevo (the district's administrative centre) by road. Lermontovo is the nearest rural locality.

References 

Rural localities in Seryshevsky District